Jerry Markon is an American journalist. He covered the United States Department of Homeland Security for The Washington Post until February 2017.

In 2017, Markon left The Washington Post to work on the Republican staff of the United States Senate Committee on Homeland Security and Governmental Affairs.

References

External links
Jerry Markon on C-SPAN

Living people
American male journalists
20th-century American journalists
21st-century American journalists
The Washington Post people
Year of birth missing (living people)